Jon Paul Morosi (born May 17, 1982) is an American sportswriter and reporter. Since 2016 he is an on-air personality with MLB Network, including the flagship studio show MLB Tonight. Morosi is also a columnist for MLB.com, as well as an on-air reporter for both FOX Sports and FS1. In addition, he regularly appears on MLB Network Radio on SiriusXM and FOX Sports Radio.
In addition to his Major League Baseball duties, Morosi is a reporter for NHL Network.

Early life
Jon Paul Morosi was born in Marquette, Michigan, and attended Garber High School in Essexville, Michigan, where he was a three-sport athlete and co-editor of the student newspaper. After high school he attended Harvard University, earning a degree in environmental science and public policy. While at Harvard he played four years of junior varsity baseball and covered men's hockey for the Harvard Crimson.

Journalism career
Prior to joining MLB Network, Morosi was a columnist and national baseball writer for FOXSports.com, beginning in 2009. He was hired in part due to incumbent FOX Sports baseball writer Ken Rosenthal's recommendation, whom he met four years earlier at the 2005 MLB general managers' meeting.

Previously, Morosi was a beat writer for the Detroit Free Press, covering the Tigers from 2006 to 2009. Morosi came to the Free Press after serving as a backup beat writer for the Seattle Post-Intelligencer during the Seattle Mariners' 2005 season. He also spent time at the Boston Globe and Houston Chronicle, among others.

Morosi has a passion for international baseball and the World Baseball Classic in particular. MLB Network, the exclusive rights-holder to the WBC, devoted segments in 2017 to what it termed "J.P. Morosi's International Pastime."

References

External links

1982 births
Living people
American sportswriters
American reporters and correspondents
Major League Baseball broadcasters
MLB Network personalities
Harvard University alumni
People from Marquette, Michigan
People from Ann Arbor, Michigan